Aobei station is a station on Line 14 of Shenzhen Metro in Shenzhen, Guangdong, China. It opened on 28 October 2022.

Station layout

Exits

References

External links
 Shenzhen Metro Aobei Station (Chinese)
 Shenzhen Metro Aobei Station (English)

Railway stations in Guangdong
Shenzhen Metro stations
Longgang District, Shenzhen
Railway stations in China opened in 2022